Johannes "Hans" Nieuwenburg (born 5 June 1968 in Koudekerk aan den Rijn) is a former water polo defender from the Netherlands, who participated in two Summer Olympics. In 1992 he finished in ninth position with the Dutch National Men's Team, in 1996 he was the captain of the squad that finished in tenth spot, under the guidance of head coach and former international Hans van Zeeland.

Nieuwenburg works as a freelance sportswriter, and is the chief editor of the Dutch water polo magazine called ManMeer!

References
 Dutch Olympic Committee

1968 births
Living people
Dutch male water polo players
Olympic water polo players of the Netherlands
Water polo players at the 1992 Summer Olympics
Water polo players at the 1996 Summer Olympics
People from Koudekerk aan den Rijn
Sportspeople from South Holland
20th-century Dutch people